Trojanov Grad or Town of Trajan was a fortress on mountain Cer, central Serbia, which is being attributed to the mythical Slavic Emperor Trajan.

Today it is possible to see only remains of one defense wall.

See also

Koviljkin grad
Vidin Grad
Gensis (vicus)
Museum in Loznica

References

External links
Mountain Cer

Archaeological sites in Serbia
Roman towns and cities in Serbia